Keith Vincent Batchelor (4 October 1930 – 24 September 2009) was a former Australian rules footballer, who played in the Victorian Football League (VFL) for Collingwood and  in the 1950s.  He made his senior debut in the 1952 VFL Grand Final.

Family
The son of Collingwood footballer Vincent George Batchelor (1900-1981), and Mary Alice Batchelor (1902-1970), née Wescott, Keith Vincent Batchelor was born in Melbourne on 4 October 1930.

He married Claire Lavinia Kennedy (1931-2014) on 20 February 1954.

Football

Collingwood (VFL)
Batchelor came to Collingwood in 1949 as a forward from the suburban club Murrumbeena.

Carlton (VFL)
Although he was listed by Carlton (1951), and although he played in the Carlton Reserves, he was unable to get a senior game.

Collingwood (VFL)
In 1952 he was cleared back to Collingwood.

Injuries late in the season allowed the selectors to play him as a defender in the Reserves. Due to his good form in the reserves, and injuries to senior players, he made his senior debut at full-back in the 1952 VFL Grand Final: his opponent, George Goninon, kicked five goals against him, and Geelong won the match by 46 points.

In the 1953 VFL Grand Final Batchelor was played at full-forward; he kicked 4 goals, and Collingwood won the match by 11 points.

North Melbourne (VFL)

He was 20th man in his last senior match for North Melbourne, against Collingwood, at Victoria Park, on 17 August 1957, the second-last home-and-away match of the 1957 season, and replaced an injured Ray Murphy in the third quarter of the match. He played for the North Melbourne Reserves in the Second Semi-Final against Fitzroy, on 7 September; he injured his knee and was replaced in the third-quarter. He also played at full-back in the Reserves Preliminary-Final against Essendon, on 14 September 1957, and was one of North Melbourne's best players in its Reserves Grand Final win over Fitzroy on 21 September 1957. He was selected as 20th man in the North Melbourne team that lost to Geelong in the 24 September 1957 Night Premiership match.

Cricket
He was also a capable cricketer, and played nine first XI district matches as a specialist bowler for Collingwood between 1949 and 1961.

Death
He died in Sydney, New South Wales on 24 September 2009.

Notes

References
 
 Grand Finals: Victorian Rules' Greatest Moments – Stories and Research by Jim Main, Murray Publishers Pty Ltd, Sydney.

External links
 
 
 Keith Batchelor, at Collingwood Forever.

2009 deaths
1930 births
Australian rules footballers from Melbourne
VFL/AFL Players who played their first game in a Grand Final
Collingwood Football Club players
North Melbourne Football Club players
One-time VFL/AFL Premiership players
Collingwood Football Club Premiership players